Pannipar Kamnueng (born January 22, 1976) is a Thai former football referee.

She first refereed internationally at the 2004 FIFA U-19 Women's World Championship before going on to officiate at the 2005 East Asian Cup.

Kamnueng was chosen for the 2007 FIFA Women's World Cup in China and refereed Brazil's 5–0 win against New Zealand.

Early life

Kamnueng graduated with a bachelor's degree from the Faculty of Education, Physical Education, Kasetsart University. She was a national hockey player once in her life, which was the 20th SEA Games in 1999 and received a bronze medal.

References

1976 births
Pannipar Kamnueng
Women association football referees
FIFA Women's World Cup referees
Living people
Pannipar Kamnueng
Pannipar Kamnueng